Varmo is a comune (municipality) in the Province of Udine in the Italian region Friuli-Venezia Giulia, located about  northwest of Trieste and about  southwest of Udine.

Varmo borders the following municipalities: Bertiolo, Camino al Tagliamento, Codroipo, Morsano al Tagliamento, Rivignano, Ronchis, San Michele al Tagliamento.

The comune of Varmo includes 9 towns, and various localities: the main town of Varmo, Santa Marizza (with Levata), Gradiscutta, Belgrado (with Casali di Belgrado), Roveredo, Romans, Canussio (with Isola Maura, beyond the Tagliamento River), Madrisio (with Casenove) and Cornazzai (with Santa Marizzutta, Casali Pepe and S. P. Ponte di Madrisio).

References

Cities and towns in Friuli-Venezia Giulia